Adolphe Franck (1809 – 11 March 1893) was a French-Jewish philosopher who specialised in Jewish mysticism.

Early life
Franck was born in Liocourt in 1809. He originally studied to become a rabbi, but decided to become a philosopher instead as a protégé of Victor Cousin.

Academic career
He was a professor for "" from 1854 until 1881 at the Collège de France.

He also edited an 1800-page dictionary called  in 1844, and translated the Zohar into French.

At the age of 36, Franck was accepted into the Académie des Sciences Morales et Politiques.

Mysticism
Franck was a strong opponent of atheism, favouring the study of mystics and alchemists, such as Paracelsus and Martinez de Pasqually. Towards the end of his life, he made close friends with Gérard Encausse, the founder of neo-Martinism.

Peace activism
Franck was involved with the European peace movement as the president of Frédéric Passy's  (French Society of Friends of Peace) and a supporter of international arbitration efforts.

Selected works

References

1809 births
1893 deaths
19th-century French Jews
19th-century French philosophers
French pacifists
Academic staff of the Collège de France